Christine "Peanut" Vardaros is a vegan professional cyclist 

, both vegan and professional since 2000.  She began her cycling career in 1996 as a mountain biker for Team Breezer run by Joe Breeze while still living in her hometown of Manhattan. In 2008, she relocated to Mill Valley, California to pursue her goal of becoming a professional which she achieved two years later.  In 2002, she transitioned from the mountain bike to the road and cyclo-cross. In 2008, Vardaros again relocated to her current residence in Everberg, Belgium.  Since this relocation, she is most known as a cyclo-cross specialist.

She represented USA Cycling at 3 World Cyclo-Cross Championships as well as over 25 Cyclo-Cross World Cups since year 2002.  In addition, she has made many appearances to the podium of UCI International events, including a few wins.

Vardaros has been profiled in many magazines, newspapers and other media outlets for her cycling accomplishments as well as for her vegan diet.  She has appeared in websites such as Yoga Journal,  Slowtwitch.com, Vivalavegan.net, Vegtomato.org (in Chinese), Roadbikereview.com, Dailypeloton.com and Greatveganathletes.com.

In addition, Vardaros is spokesperson for In Defense of Animals, The Vegan Society, and Physicians Committee for Responsible Medicine.

Vardaros graduated from Columbia College of Columbia University in 1991.

References

1969 births
21st-century American women
Living people
American female cyclists
American people of Greek descent
American veganism activists
Columbia College (New York) alumni
Cyclists from New York (state)
Cyclo-cross cyclists